Styggehøbretindan is a mountain in Vågå Municipality in Innlandet county, Norway. The mountain is surrounded by several other notable mountains including Veotinden to the northwest, Styggehøi to the northeast, Gloptinden to the southeast, Surtningssue and Blåbreahøe to the south, and Austre Memurutinden to the west.

The mountain has two peaks which are located on the north and south sides of the Styggehøbrean glacier.

See also
List of mountains of Norway by height

References

Jotunheimen
Vågå
Mountains of Innlandet